Liberman [ˈlɪbərmən] (original Cyrillic Либерман [lʲɪbʲɪrˈman]), is a Russian-American variant of the German surname Liebermann.   Liberman can also refer to:

People

Alexander Liberman (1912-1999), Russian-American artist
Alvin Liberman, American psychologist
Anatoly Liberman (born 1937), linguist
Evsei Liberman, Soviet economist
Joseph Liberman, Soviet mathematician
Judith Liberman (born 1978), French fairy tale narrator
Mark Liberman, American linguist
Russell James Liberman (1945–1977), American funny car drag racer
Tetyana Hryhorivna Liberman, known as Tina Karol (born 1985), Ukrainian singer, actress, and television presenter
Daniil and David Liberman (born 1982 and 1984), entrepreneurs

Other

Liberman Broadcasting, media company based in Burbank, California
Liberman Broadcasting tower (Era, Texas), in Cooke County, Texas
Liberman's lemma a theorem used in studying intrinsic geometry of convex surface  
Liberman (album), Vanessa Carlton 2015

See also
 Lieberman, a surname

Jewish surnames